A warehouseman can be someone who works in a warehouse, usually delivering goods for sale or storage, or, in older usage, someone who owns a warehouse and sells goods directly from it or from a shop fronting onto the warehouse (similar to a modern Cash and carry).

An Italian warehouseman was someone who stocked goods from Italy such as pasta, olive oil, pickles, perfumes, fruits, paints and pigments (they were often known as Oil and Italian warehouseman or Oilman and Italian warehouseman to highlight the selling of oil products).

A Manchester warehouseman was a wholesaler of linen and cloth made in the factories surrounding Manchester in the North-West of England.

In law, a warehouseman can be entitled to a warehouseman's lien for work done but not yet paid for.

References

Service occupations
Common law legal terminology